Harry Rosen, CM (born 1931) is the founder and executive chairman of the Canadian luxury men's wear store Harry Rosen Inc., which in 2015 was Canada's largest upscale menswear retailer.

Early life
Born and raised in Toronto to a Jewish family, Rosen lived for a short time in Callander, Ontario. As a teenager he found a job at a men's haberdashery shop. There he learned about the composition of clothing and, more importantly, about men's shopping habits.

After dropping out of high school he borrowed $500 and opened a men's clothing store.

Career
With help from a family friend and connections in the cloth manufacturing business, he opened Harry Rosen Inc., on February 4, 1954 in Cabbagetown, Toronto, with his brother Lou.

In 1961, the store moved to Toronto's downtown core on Richmond Street. That year Rosen met Stann Burkhoff, an advertising executive, and Burkhoff agreed to do some ads for the store in exchange for two suits — one for him and one for his art director. Together, they developed the 'Ask Harry' campaign. These ads ran in Canada's national newspaper, The Globe and Mail. It was so successful that people from across the country began coming to Harry Rosen.

In 2016, Rosen was presented with a Fashion Visionary Award by Fashion Group International.

Novel advertisements
Rosen frequently appeared in store advertisements in partnership with The Globe and Mail. One ad features Rosen having just locked up his store for the evening, when he notices one of his window mannequins reading the Globe and Mail; Rosen is also carrying a copy in his arm while there is also one of the newspaper's vending boxes in the background of the street.

Upon spelling the name of Winnipeg wrong after opening the city's first store there, Rosen later took out an ad in the Winnipeg Free Press saying "I will not spell Winnipegger as "Winnippegger".

When the original main store was burned down, Rosen took out an ad which was almost mistaken for an Obituary.

Rosen's ads based on political figures have sometimes been controversial.

Personal life
Rosen has been married to his wife, Evelyn, for over 60 years. They have 4 children and 9 grandchildren. His eldest son, Larry, is the CEO of Harry Rosen Inc.

Philanthropy
Rosen has been active in the Canadian Paraplegic Association, Corporate Fund for Breast Cancer, Cancer Care Fund, Mount Sinai Friends for Life Campaign, Ryerson University Board of Governors, George Brown Board of Governors, University of Western Ontario Board of Governors, oDesign Exchange. He served a three-year term as Campaign Chairman for the Canadian Cancer Society, Metropolitan Toronto.

In 2004, he served on the Mt. Sinai Board of Governors, Ryerson B.Com program in retailing advisory board and on the Cabinet of Major Individual Gifts for the United Way of Canada.

He appeared in a promotional campaign for the Centre for Addiction and Mental Health to promote services for those affected by addiction and mental health issues in the Toronto area.

In April 2010 he was honoured at a fundraising event for The University Health Network called "Hats Off To Harry"

Awards
1987 — Retail Marketer of the Year by the Retail Council of Canada
2001 — Retail Council of Canada's Lifetime Achievement Award
2003 — Honorary Doctorate in Commerce, Ryerson University
2004 — Order of Canada.
2005 — the Pitti Immagine Uomo Award from the Italian fashion community

References

External links
 Harry Rosen Bio
 Harry Rosen Consulting
 Men's wear proved perfect fit for Rosen

1931 births
Living people
Businesspeople from Toronto
Jewish Canadian philanthropists
Members of the Order of Canada